Dick Kelsey (born December 30, 1946) is a former Republican member of the Kansas Senate, representing the 26th district from 2009 until 2013. He was previously a Kansas Representative elected in 2005.

Kelsey was a candidate for the United States House of Representatives in Kansas's 4th congressional district to succeed fellow Republican Todd Tiahrt.  He suspended his campaign on March 5, 2010 due to health concerns of his wife.  Kelsey endorsed Mike Pompeo to replace Tiahrt on March 17, 2010.

Issue positions
Sen. Kelsey's issue positions and what he supports, according to his website:
 Budget transparency
 Less government spending
 Tax decreases- including the prevention of higher taxes by signing the Taxpayer Protection Pledge 
 Funds for maintaining and improving the public schools
 Making abortion illegal
 Tougher penalties for crime
 Affordable health care and putting "Kansans in charge of their health care dollars."
 Enforcing immigration laws; penalties for illegal immigrants
 Business growth and private sector job growth

Committee assignments
Sen. Kelsey serves on these legislative committees:
 Commerce
 Joint Committee on Corrections and Juvenile Justice Oversight
 Financial Institutions and Insurance
 Public Health and Welfare

Sponsored legislation
Legislation sponsored or co-sponsored by Sen. Kelsey includes:
 An act repealing the Kansas insurance score act
 A resolution regarding the right to bear arms
 An amendment to have supreme court justices' appointments subject to consent of the Senate.
 A proposition to create a budget stabilization fund

Major donors
Some of the top contributors to Sen. Kelsey's 2008 campaign, according to the National Institute on Money in State Politics:
 Kansas Republican Senatorial Committee, Koch Industries, Kansas Association of Realtors, Restore America PAC Inc., Kansas Medical Society PAC. His total funds raised were $44,000.

His opponent was Pam Frieden who raised $39,000.  Her major contributors included the Kansas NEA,   Zollerlutzweinbarager LLC,  and the Wichita-Hutchinson Labor Federation.

References

External links
 Dick Kelsey for Congress congressional campaign website
Kansas Senate
Project Vote Smart profile
 Follow the Money campaign contributions
 2006, 2008
 Americans for Tax Reform

Republican Party members of the Kansas House of Representatives
Republican Party Kansas state senators
Living people
1946 births
Politicians from Camden, New Jersey
21st-century American politicians